Nokia 230  is a line of Microsoft Mobile. The Nokia 230 has one SIM card slot, and the Nokia 230 Dual SIM with two slots. Initially, Nokia 230 was only released in black and white, but would later add dark blue and light gray color options after the release of Nokia 106 (2018).

Features 

The phone comes with a 2.8 inch TFT screen, 2MP cameras with flash and Nokia Series 30+ operating system. 
The 30+ series is a licensed software platform and interface licensed from MediaTek, not part of Nokia's previous 30 series platform.

Reference 

230
Mobile phones introduced in 2015
Mobile phones with user-replaceable battery